John "Dan" Archer (18 June 1941 – 12 December 2021) was an English former footballer who played as a midfielder and inside forward for five professional teams.

He began his career with Port Vale in July 1958, before moving on to Bournemouth & Boscombe Athletic in May 1961. Five years later he signed with Crewe Alexandra for a £3,000 fee. He helped the club to win promotion out of the Fourth Division in 1967–68, but was sold on to Huddersfield Town for £8,000 in January 1968. He then signed with Chesterfield for a £1,000 fee in May 1969, and captained the club to the Fourth Division title in 1969–70. He later played for Sandbach Ramblers, Congleton Town and Nantwich Town, and scouted for Chesterfield.

Career

Port Vale
Archer graduated through the Port Vale junior squad to sign as a professional in July 1958. He made his Third Division debut in the 1959–60 campaign under manager Norman Low. He scored twice against Wrexham in a 3–1 victory at Vale Park on 16 April 1960, finishing the campaign with three goals in six games. However, he featured just four times on 1960–61, and was moved on to league rivals Bournemouth & Boscombe Athletic on a free transfer in May 1961, then managed by Bill McGarry.

Bournemouth & Boscombe Athletic
He scored two goals on his club debut. Bournemouth were pushing promotion, and finished in third place, three points short of promotion in 1961–62. They finished in fifth place in 1962–63, six points short of their target. A fourth-place finish followed in 1963–64, four points shy of promotion. They then dropped to eleventh place in 1964–65 under Reg Flewin. Archer left the club following a further slip down the table in 1965–66 under Freddie Cox's stewardship. He scored 37 goals in 139 league games during his time on the south coast.

Crewe Alexandra
He then moved on to Ernie Tagg's Crewe Alexandra for a £3,000 fee and was converted from an inside forward into a midfielder. Crewe were aiming for promotion in the Fourth Division, but the "Railwaymen" finished fifth in 1966–67, four points short of promotion. Crewe won promotion the following season, though Archer left the club midway through.

Huddersfield Town
In January 1968, Archer was sold to Huddersfield Town for a fee of £8,000 plus a player in exchange. He played nine Second Division games without scoring under Tom Johnston in the 1967–68 campaign and struggled with injuries.

Chesterfield
Archer remained in the Fourth Division after putting pen to paper with Chesterfield, where he was also appointed club captain after being signed for a £1,000 fee in May 1969; manager Jimmy McGuigan could have signed him on a free transfer but decided to authorise the transfer fee so as to prevent other clubs from making Archer an offer. After finishing just one place and two points above the re-election zone in 1968–69, the "Spireites" topped the division in 1969–70; Archer scored two goals direct from corners during the 1969–70 season. They then finished fifth in 1970–71, nine points short of a second successive promotion. He took over penalty taking duties from Kevin Randall in 1971. Archer retired after the club finished in mid-table in 1971–72. Fans nicknamed him Dan Archer after The Archers radio programme. He played a total of 129 games for Chesterfield, scoring 24 goals.

Style of play
Able to play as an inside forward or midfielder, Archer was a slow, stocky and aggressive player who had good technical qualities, vision and set piece ability. These abilities made up for a lack of pace, whilst his leadership compensated for his occasional lack of discipline.

Later life
After retiring from the professional game, Archer became player-manager of Sandbach Ramblers and also appeared for Congleton Town before holding the managerial reins at Nantwich Town from January 1982 to the end of the season. He also scouted in Wales and the West Country for former club Chesterfield. He also worked as a greenkeeper at Malkins Bank course, near Sandbach. He also served as the President of the Wrekin Federation of Pigeon Fanciers. 

Archer died in December 2021, aged 80.

Career statistics
Source:

Honours
Chesterfield
Football League Fourth Division: 1969–70

References

1941 births
2021 deaths
People from Biddulph
English footballers
Association football inside forwards
Association football midfielders
Port Vale F.C. players
AFC Bournemouth players
Crewe Alexandra F.C. players
Huddersfield Town A.F.C. players
Chesterfield F.C. players
Sandbach Ramblers F.C. players
Congleton Town F.C. players
Nantwich Town F.C. players
English Football League players
English football managers
Nantwich Town F.C. managers
Chesterfield F.C. non-playing staff